Sabine Schmidtke is a German academic, historian, and scholar of Islamic studies. She is Professor of Islamic Intellectual History at the Institute for Advanced Study in Princeton. Schmidtke was elected Member to the American Philosophical Society in 2017. She was appointed Corresponding Member of the Austrian Academy of Sciences in 2021.

Education and career
Schmidtke earned an undergraduate degree (summa cum laude) from the Hebrew University of Jerusalem in 1986 and an M.A. from the School of Oriental and African Studies, University of London in 1987. She got her Ph.D. from the University of Oxford in 1990. From 1991 to 1999 she was a diplomat in the German Foreign Office.

From 1997 to 1999 she was a lecturer in Islamic studies at the University of Bonn and did her Habilitation while there. From 1999 to 2014 she taught Islamic Studies at the Free University of Berlin where she was a Founding Director of the Department of "Intellectual History of the Islamic World". She also held fellowships at the Hebrew University of Jerusalem (2002, 2003; 2005-2006), the Institute for Advanced Study in Princeton (2008-2009), the Katz Center for Advanced Judaic Studies (University of Pennsylvania) in Philadelphia (2010), Tel Aviv University (2011), and the Scaliger Institute in Leiden University (2013).

In July 2014 she became Professor of Islamic Intellectual History in the School of Historical Studies at the Institute for Advanced Study in Princeton.

Bibliography
 Die Bibel in den Augen muslimischer Gelehrter: mit einem Geleitwort von Martin Grötschel, Research Unit Intellectual History of the Islamate World: Freie Universität Berlin, 2013, 
 The Theology of al-ʿAllāma al-Ḥillī K. Schwarz, Berlin, 1991,

References

External links
 Home page of Sabine Schmidtke at The Institute for Advanced Study
 Curriculum vitae of Sabine Schmidtke at the Institute for Advanced Study

20th-century German historians
20th-century German women writers
21st-century German historians
21st-century German women writers
Alumni of SOAS University of London
Alumni of the University of Oxford
Corresponding Members of the Austrian Academy of Sciences
Academic staff of the Free University of Berlin
German emigrants to England
German emigrants to Israel
German emigrants to the United States
German women historians
Hebrew University of Jerusalem alumni
Academic staff of the Hebrew University of Jerusalem
Institute for Advanced Study faculty
Academic staff of Leiden University
Living people
Members of the American Philosophical Society
German Islamic studies scholars
Academic staff of Tel Aviv University
Academic staff of the University of Bonn
University of Pennsylvania faculty
Year of birth missing (living people)
Women scholars of Islam